The 2008 NORCECA Beach Volleyball Circuit at Guadalajara was held May 7–12, 2008 in Guadalajara, Jalisco, Mexico. It was the fifth leg of the NORCECA Beach Volleyball Circuit 2008.

Women's competition

Men's competition

References
 Norceca

Guadalajara
Norceca Beach Volleyball Circuit (Guadalajara), 2008